Isaac Jay Nauta (born May 21, 1997) is an American football tight end who is a free agent. He played college football at Georgia.

High school career
Nauta attended IMG Academy in Bradenton, Florida for his senior season. During his senior season Nauta played in eight games, catching 13 passes for 230 yards and two touchdowns. Nauta played football and basketball while at IMG Academy. In his senior year he was named to the U.S. Army All-American Bowl and USA Today All-USA First-team.

Considered a five-star recruit by all major recruiting services, he was rated as the best tight end prospect of his class. He committed to Georgia on January 9, 2016.

College career

Freshman
Considered by far the best true freshman tight end in the country, Nauta finished the season with 353 yards on 27 catches as he developed early chemistry with fellow true freshman quarterback Jacob Eason. Nauta was a key weapon for the Georgia passing game, lining up on the outside and in the slot quite a bit as he dwarfed the rest of the nation's true freshman tight ends statistically. He was selected to the freshman All-America team by ESPN, USA Today, Athlon Sports, Football Writers Association, and Campus Insiders.

Professional career

Detroit Lions
Nauta was drafted by the Detroit Lions in the seventh round with the 224th overall pick in the 2019 NFL Draft. He was waived on August 31, 2019, but was signed to the practice squad the following day. He was promoted to the active roster on November 23, 2019.

Nauta was placed on the reserve/COVID-19 list by the Lions on July 30, 2020, and he was activated from the list four days later. He was waived on September 5, 2020, and signed to the practice squad the next day. He was elevated to the active roster on October 17 and 24 for the team's weeks 6 and 7 games against the Jacksonville Jaguars and Atlanta Falcons, and reverted to the practice squad after each game. He was promoted to the active roster on October 31. He was waived on December 5, 2020.

Green Bay Packers
On December 12, 2020, Nauta signed with the practice squad of the Green Bay Packers. On January 25, 2021, Nauta signed a reserve/futures contract with the Packers. He was placed on injured reserve on August 16, 2021. He was released on August 25.

Arlington Renegades 
On November 17, 2022, Nauta was drafted by the Arlington Renegades of the XFL. He was released on March 8, 2023.

NFL career statistics

Regular season

References

External links
Green Bay Packers bio
Georgia Bulldogs bio

1997 births
Living people
American football tight ends
People from Buford, Georgia
Sportspeople from the Atlanta metropolitan area
Players of American football from Georgia (U.S. state)
Georgia Bulldogs football players
Detroit Lions players
Green Bay Packers players
Arlington Renegades players